Hendrik Anniko (also Heinrich Anniko; 8 August 1867 Holdre Parish (now Tõrva Parish), Kreis Fellin – 27 November 1954 Baltimore, United States) was an Estonian politician. He was a member of II Riigikogu.

References

1867 births
1954 deaths
People from Tõrva Parish
People from Kreis Fellin
Christian People's Party (Estonia) politicians
Members of the Riigikogu, 1923–1926
Members of the Riigikogu, 1926–1929
Estonian World War II refugees
Estonian emigrants to the United States